Thomas Scott, R.S.A., R.S.W. (1854–1927) was a Scottish painter, primarily a watercolourist. He was born in Selkirk in the Scottish Borders, on 27 October 1854.

Selection of Scott's work

References

External links

19th-century Scottish painters
Scottish male painters
20th-century Scottish painters
1854 births
1927 deaths
People from Selkirk, Scottish Borders
Scottish watercolourists
19th-century Scottish male artists
20th-century Scottish male artists